Bagra (also, Bāgra) is a village in Chittagong Division, Bangladesh.

References
 

Populated places in Chittagong Division